Patrick Bernhardt (born October 26, 1971 in Wetzlar) is a German auto racing driver.

Career
Bernhardt competed in the German Formula Three Championship in 1993 and 1994 for Volkswagen Motorsport. He also competed in the German Super Touring Championship in 1994.

Bernhardt returned to motor racing in 2000 when he began competing in the German Touring Car Challenge for Hotfiel Sport in a Ford Focus, which he did until 2004. He finished 2000 in eleventh place, but improved to finish fourth in 2001. He finished runner-up to Claudia Hürtgen in 2003.

The team joined the new World Touring Car Championship in 2005. Bernhardt spent most of the season as a development driver for the team, but was given his chance at the end of season Race of Macau.

References

External links

1971 births
Living people
People from Wetzlar
Sportspeople from Giessen (region)
Racing drivers from Hesse
German racing drivers
German Formula Three Championship drivers
World Touring Car Championship drivers
European Touring Car Championship drivers
Nürburgring 24 Hours drivers
Volkswagen Motorsport drivers